Birsemore is a village in Aberdeenshire, Scotland opposite Aboyne on the River Dee.

References

Villages in Aberdeenshire